Hai Master is a 2007 Sri Lankan Sinhala comedy, action film directed by Ranjith Siriwardena and produced by Suranga de Alwis. It stars Jeevan Kumaratunga, Dilhani Ekanayake, comic duo Bandu Samarasinghe, and Tennyson Cooray in lead roles along with Freddie Silva, Lionel Deraniyagala, Sunil Hettiarachchi and Wilson Karunaratne. It is the 1091st Sri Lankan film in the Sinhala cinema.

Plot

Cast
 Jeevan Kumaratunga as Saman
 Dilhani Ekanayake as Surangani
 Bandu Samarasinghe as Bandara
 Tennyson Cooray as 
 Roy de Silva as Master
 Freddie Silva as Pushpadeva
 Sunil Hettiarachchi as Arachchila servant
 Sumana Amarasinghe as Piyambika
 Lionel Deraniyagala
 Wilson Karunaratne
 Srinath Maldeniya
 M. S. Fernando
 Lal Senadeera
 Nihal Silva
 Susila Kuragama

Soundtrack

References

2007 films
2000s Sinhala-language films
2007 action comedy films
Sri Lankan comedy films
2007 comedy films